Narrative is a non-profit digital publisher of fiction, poetry, non-fiction, and art founded in 2003 by Tom Jenks and Carol Edgarian. Narrative publishes weekly and provides educational resources to teachers and students; subscription and access to its content is free.

Overview

Narrative was cofounded in 2003 by the former editor of Esquire, Gentlemen’s Quarterly, and Scribner, Tom Jenks, and New York Times-bestselling author Carol Edgarian.

Narrative is headquartered in San Francisco. It publishes fiction, creative non-fiction, poetry, and art pf different forms from established and emerging writers . Additionally, Narrative coined the iStory—a short, dramatic narrative, fiction or nonfiction, up to 150 words long—and the iPoem—a short poem that fits within no more than two screens on the iPhone (up to 150 words long). It also publishes features on craft, teaching, and other topics related to professional writing. All works of contemporary writing accepted by the magazine are previously unpublished. All Narrative writers are paid for their contributions. Here are the submission guidelines.

Narrative’s team of editors include co-founders Tom Jenks and Carol Edgarian, Michael Wiegers of Copper Canyon Press, among others.

Narrative was also the first literary magazine available for the Kindle.

Prizes and Writers

Narrative awards various prizes to writers throughout the year. Its namesake recognition, the Narrative Prize, is a single $5,000 prize awarded annually to a new or emerging writer published in Narrative. Narrative Prize winners include:

—Sarah Balakrishnan (2022)

—Morgan Talty (2021)

—Tryphena L Yeboah (2021)

—Gbenga Adesina (2020) 

—Brenden Willey (2019) 

—Paisley Rekdal (2018) 

—Javier Zamora (2017) 

—Sara Houghteling (2016) 

—Ocean Vuong (2015) 

—Austin Smith (2014) 

—Kirstin Valdez Quade (2013) 

—Nathan Poole (2012)

—Natalie Diaz (2012) 

—Kevin A. González (2011) 

—Anthony Marra (2010) 

—Maud Newton (2009)

—Alexi Zentner (2008)

—Michael Dickman (2008)

—Alma García (2007)

—Saidiya Hartman (2007) 

—Mermer Blakeslee (2006)

—Ned Parker (2006)

—Pia Z Ehrhardt (2005)

—Min Jin Lee (2004)

Other Narrative awards include the Narrative Spring, Fall, and Winter Fiction and Nonfiction Contests, the Annual Narrative Poetry Contest, and more. Each contest awards monetary prizes. 

Other Narrative writers include Chris Abani, Ann Beattie, Sharon Olds, Jennifer Egan, Tobias Wolff, Jericho Brown, and more. Narrative writers have earned the Nobel Prize, Pulitzer Prize, National Book Award, Whiting Awards, the Pushcart Prize, and the Atlantic prize, and have appeared in collections such as The Best American Short Stories, The Best American Nonrequired Reading, and others.

Narrative for Schools

Narrative for Schools is a program that was founded in 2014 by Narrative co-founder Carol Edgarian to provide teachers and students with free literary educational tools and content. Narrative for Schools offers writing video tutorials, reading lists, and the Narrative High School Writing Contest.

The annual winners of the Narrative High School Writing Contest Annual winners are awarded monetary prizes, mentorship, and publication in Narrative. Originally an essay contest, the competition has expanded to include fiction, nonfiction, and poetry.

Narrative Library

The Narrative library includes thousands of works of fiction, poetry, non-fiction, and art available for free. It is searchable by themes categorized under the headings "Living," "Social Commentary," "Relationships," "The Environment," "The Spiritual," "Travel," "The Writing Life," and "Holidays."

References

External links

—Official Narrative Magazine site

—Narrative celebrates 15 years and pays homage to Tobias Wolff from The San Francisco Chronicle

—2 editors' online journal gives new life to literature by San Francisco Gate

—Narrative magazine keeps evolving by The The Washington Post

—Association of Writers and Writing Programs

See also
List of literary magazines

Magazines established in 2003
Online literary magazines published in the United States
2003 establishments in California
Magazines published in San Francisco